Fatimah Muhammad Sha'ban (born 1965) is an Omani writer. She was the first Omani woman to publish a short story collection.

Works
 Tariq al-nadam [Experienced through Sorrow], 1994
 Maw'id ma'a al-qadar [Meeting through Destiny], 2001

References

1965 births
Living people
Omani writers
Omani women writers
Omani short story writers